Zhaoqing railway station serves the city of Zhaoqing, Guangdong province, China. The station hosts train services to and from Guangzhou, Hong Kong, Kunming, Nanning, Hainan, and other parts of China.

The station is an intermediate stop on the Guangzhou–Maoming railway and the western terminus of the higher-speed Guangzhou–Foshan–Zhaoqing intercity railway.

History 
The station has an immigration checkpoint within the station for the daily Guangdong Through Train service to and from Hung Hom station in Kowloon, Hong Kong. Due to the renovation of the checkpoint, the through train service has been suspended since 16 April 2017. The service was officially shortened to Guangzhou East railway station on 10 June 2019, leaving the border crossing facilities in the station abandoned.

On 10 April 2021, service patterns were changed and through running between Zhaoqing and Shenzhen Airport was introduced.

References

Buildings and structures in Zhaoqing
China–Hong Kong border crossings
Railway stations in Guangdong